Rutherford is an impact crater on Mars. It is located the Oxia Palus quadrangle inside Arabia Terra at 19.2° N and 10.7° W. and measures approximately 107 kilometers in diameter. The crater was named after British physicist Ernest Rutherford in 1973.

Description 

Some close up images of the crater show dunes and light-toned material.  Light-toned rocks on Mars have been associated with hydrated minerals like sulfates. The Mars rover Opportunity examined such layers close-up with several instruments. Scientists are excited about finding hydrated minerals such as sulfates and clays on Mars because they are usually formed in the presence of water.  Places that contain clays and/or other hydrated minerals would be good places to look for evidence of life.

Gallery

See also 
 List of craters on Mars

References 

Impact craters on Mars
Oxia Palus quadrangle